Istok State Scientific Production is a company based in Fryazino, Russia. It is part of the Ruselectronics group.

Istok is a major producer of electronic components for space and military use, including magnetrons, klystrons, high-powered vacuum tubes, carbon dioxide lasers, electro-optical devices. It has also developed and manufactured consumer products for the national economy since the 1960s.

References

External links
 Official website

Electronics companies of Russia
Ruselectronics
Companies based in Moscow Oblast
Electronics companies of the Soviet Union
Ministry of the Electronics Industry (Soviet Union)